Me and My Kid Brother is a 1967 Danish comedy film directed by Lau Lauritzen Jr. and starring Dirch Passer.

Cast
 Dirch Passer as Søren Severinsen
 Poul Reichhardt as Peter Severinsen
 Lily Broberg as Annelise Hansen
 Jesper Langberg as Jens Olsen
 Else-Marie as Sofie Olsen
 Gunnar Lauring as Sognerådsformanden
 Karl Stegger as Thorvald Christensen
 Guri Richter as Olivia Christensen
 Lotte Horne as Lone Christensen
 Palle Huld as Frederik Holm
 Lise Thomsen as Fru. Holm
 Arthur Jensen as Amtmanden
 Christian Arhoff as Landbetjent Rasmussen
 Valsø Holm as Landsretssagfører Mortensen
 Peer Guldbrandsen as Værten
 Einar Juhl as Minister
 Elga Olga Svendsen as Minister
 Bjørn Spiro as Tysk turist

External links

1967 films
1967 comedy films
1960s Danish-language films
Films directed by Lau Lauritzen Jr.
Films scored by Sven Gyldmark
ASA Filmudlejning films
Danish comedy films